Jan Popiel (born October 9, 1947) is a Danish-Canadian former professional ice hockey player who played 296 games in the World Hockey Association.  He played for the Chicago Cougars, Denver Spurs, Houston Aeros and Phoenix Roadrunners. He is the younger brother of former NHL player Poul Popiel.

Popiel was drafted 10th overall in the 1964 NHL Entry Draft by the Chicago Black Hawks making him the highest drafted Danish-born player in NHL history until Mikkel Bødker was drafted in 2008 as number 8. Popiel, however, was raised in Canada (his family moved to St. Catharines, Ontario in 1951 when he was a child ) and is a Canadian citizen.

Popiel also played professional lacrosse, scoring five goals in six games for the Montreal Canadiens of the National Lacrosse Association of 1968.

References

External links 

1947 births
Living people
Canadian ice hockey left wingers
Chicago Blackhawks draft picks
Chicago Cougars players
Canadian people of Danish descent
Danish emigrants to Canada
Danish ice hockey left wingers
Denver Spurs (WHA) players
Greensboro Generals (EHL) players
Houston Aeros (WHA) players
Ice hockey people from Ontario
People from Lyngby-Taarbæk Municipality
Phoenix Roadrunners (WHA) players
Salem Rebels (EHL) players
Sportspeople from St. Catharines
Tulsa Oilers (1964–1984) players
Canadian expatriate ice hockey players in the United States